This is a list of Belgian film directors.

A
Chantal Akerman
R. Kan Albay
Jean-Jacques Andrien

B
Tom Barman
Rémy Belvaux
Alain Berliner
Bert Beyens
Jef Bruyninckx
Jean-Marie Buchet
Jan Bucquoy

C
 Bo & Gustavo Catilina
Stijn Coninx
Gérard Corbiau

D
Jean-Pierre Dardenne
Luc Dardenne
Emile Degelin
Robbe De Hert
Charles Dekeukeleire
Eric de Kuyper
André Delvaux
E.G. de Meyst
Dominique Deruddere
Marc Didden
Pieter Dirkx
Frederik Du Chau
Fabrice Du Welz

E
Adil El Arbi
Geoffrey Enthoven

F
Bilall Fallah
Jacques Feyder
Anna Frijters

G
Jonas Geirnaert
Noël Godin
Felix Van Groeningen

J
Edward José

K
Yasmine Kassari
Edith Kiel
Harry Kümel

L
Patrick Lebon
Joachim Lafosse
Benoît Lamy
Bouli Lanners
Vincent Lannoo
Boris Lehman
Nicholas Lens
Roland Lethem
Matthias Lebeer

M
Benoît Mariage
Thierry Michel
Ernst Moerman

P
Picha

R
Maurice Rabinowicz
Jo Röpke
Vincent Rouffaer
Rob Rombout

S
Raoul Servais
Ben Stassen
Henri Storck
Samy Szlingerbaum
Boris Szulzinger

T
Guy Lee Thys
Patrice Toye

U
Henri d'Ursel

V
André Valardy
Patrick Van Antwerpen
Jan Vanderheyden
Jaco Van Dormael
Erik Van Looy
Frank Van Passel
Roland Verhavert

W
François Weyergans

Z
Thierry Zéno

See also
Cinema of Belgium
List of Belgian films

 
Belgium